Upernavik Glacier is a large tidewater glacier in Avannaata municipality on the northwestern shore of Greenland. It drains a large portion of the Greenland ice sheet westwards into Upernavik Icefjord.

References 

Glaciers of the Upernavik Archipelago